Debel (also spelled Dibil, Arabic: دبل)  is a Lebanese village located in the caza of Bint Jbeil in the Nabatiye Governorate in Lebanon.

Geography
Debel occupies several hills with elevation ranging from 560 to 650 meters above sea level.  The main agricultural products of Debel are olives and tobacco.

Demography
The people of Debel are Lebanese and are predominantly Maronite Christians.

History
In 1596, it was named as a village, ‘“Dibil” in the Ottoman nahiya (subdistrict) of  Tibnin  under the liwa' (district) of Safad, with a population of 12  households and 6 bachelors, all Muslims. The villagers paid a fixed tax-rate of 25% on  agricultural products, such as wheat, barley,  summer crops, fruit trees, goats and beehives, in addition to "occasional revenues”; a total of 1,530 akçe.

In 1852, Edward Robinson noted the village ("Dibl") on his travels in the region.

Ernest Renan visited the area during his mission to Lebanon and described what he found in his book Mission de Phénicie (1865-1874). At Dibl he found Greek Inscriptions.

In 1875, Victor Guérin visited, and described it as a village with 400 Maronite inhabitants. He also found here several inscriptions in Greek. He further noted: "At this village there are some rock-cut tombs, in one of which there is an inscription. Many well-dressed stones are used, and turn up in digging. On one of these was a fragmentary inscription. Under some of the houses of the village there is a large piece of tesselated pavement of very good design. The colours are red, black, and white. There are some sarcophagi and some broken pillars. This was probably an early Christian site."

In 1881, the PEF's Survey of Western Palestine (SWP)  described Dibl: "A village, built of stone, containing about 500 Christians (Guerin says 400 Maronites) ; there is a Maronite chapel. It is situated on hill-side, with grapes, figs, olives, mulberries, and arable land. The water supply is from many good springs in the wady to the north-west of village, and cisterns and birket near the village."

References

Bibliography

External links
Survey of Western Palestine, Map 4: IAA, Wikimedia commons
Debl, Localiban

Populated places in the Israeli security zone 1985–2000
Maronite Christian communities in Lebanon
Populated places in Bint Jbeil District